The de Havilland DH.92 Dolphin was a 1930s British prototype light biplane airliner designed and built by the de Havilland aircraft company.

Design and development
The Dolphin was designed as a modernised version of the de Havilland Dragon Rapide, incorporating ideas from the company's DH 86A and de Havilland Dragonfly but using new main assembly designs.  It had a DH 86A-style nose to accommodate two crew side by side and increased span wings of unequal span, Dragonfly-like. It first appeared with the trousered undercarriage of these earlier biplane transports, but a retractable landing gear, rather like that of the DH.88 Comet was fitted before flight. Onboard air-stairs were one of the passenger access novelties. It was powered by two 204 hp (152 kW) de Havilland Gipsy Six piston engines. Fuel tanks were in the wings, as in the Dragonfly, to avoid the fire hazard of the Rapide's engine nacelle tanks.

One prototype was built and first flown on 9 September 1936.  Geoffrey de Havilland's log shows that he flew it only once more. No others were built as it proved to be too heavy structurally and the prototype was scrapped in December 1936.

In an edition of Flight magazine dated 10 September 1936, the decision to discontinue the type was published as follows:

Specifications

See also

References

Notes

Bibliography

External links

1930s British civil utility aircraft
Dolphin
Biplanes
Aircraft first flown in 1936
Twin piston-engined tractor aircraft